In mountaineering, a fixed rope or fixed line is the practice of fixing in place bolted ropes to assist climbers and walkers in exposed mountain locations. They are used widely on American and European climbing routes, where they may be called via ferrata routes, but are not used in "Alpine style" mountaineering. Many guided expeditions to any of the eight-thousanders normally set up fixed rope on steep or icy sections of the route. For example, on the Hillary Step of Mount Everest, fixed rope was used to reduce the bottleneck of climbers that typically results from climbing this technical section just below the summit.

In changing mountain environments such as glaciers, ice falls and areas with significant snow, fixed lines must generally be established anew at the start of each climbing season.

References 

Climbing techniques